USS Mobile Bay (CG-53) is a Ticonderoga class guided-missile cruiser serving in the United States Navy. She is named for the naval Battle of Mobile Bay during the American Civil War in 1864.

Design and construction
The ship was ordered from Ingalls Shipbuilding on 15 January 1982. She was laid down on 6 June 1984, launched on 22 August 1985, and commissioned on 21 February 1987 at the Alabama State Docks in Mobile, Alabama.

With guided missiles and rapid-fire cannons, Mobile Bay is capable of defeating threats in the air, on the sea, on shore, and undersea. She carries the Tomahawk Land Attack Missile which played an integral part in the strikes on Iraqi targets during the opening stages of Operation Iraqi Freedom in 2003. She also carries two Seahawk LAMPS multi-purpose helicopters, mainly for anti-submarine warfare (ASW). The ship is capable of conducting Maritime Interdiction Operations, and carries a fully trained boarding team.

Operational history
After commissioning, Mobile Bay joined the U.S. Atlantic Fleet, arriving at Mayport, Florida, her homeport in March 1987. Following a year of crew qualifications, tests and systems trials, Mobile Bay embarked on her maiden deployment on 11 May 1989. During this cruise, Mobile Bay earned her first two awards: the Sea Service Deployment Ribbon and the Armed Forces Expeditionary Medal, for operations conducted in the Gulf of Oman.

In June 1990, Mobile Bay shifted homeports from Mayport to Yokosuka, Japan. Shortly thereafter, she deployed in August 1990 in support of Operation Desert Shield and Operation Desert Storm, becoming the first AEGIS cruiser to circumnavigate the globe. In the Persian Gulf, the ship distinguished herself by becoming the first Battle Force Anti-Air Warfare Commander to control a four-carrier Task Force. Mobile Bay launched 22 Tomahawk land-attack cruise missile strikes, and performed as the Battle Force Anti-Surface Warfare Commander targeting Iraqi naval vessels and directing carrier-launched attack aircraft to destroy 38 Iraqi naval vessels resulting in the complete neutralization of the Iraqi Navy. Helicopter Anti-Submarine Squadron Light 43 (HSL-43) Detachment 2B was assigned with two SH-60B Seahawk helicopters aboard.

In February 1991, the Tactical Information Coordinator (TIC) aboard Mobile Bay, reported SPY-1 Radar acquisitions of what appeared to be SCUD missile launches that were detected over Saudi Arabia. These tracks were reported over Data Systems Administration (DSA) and Anti-Air Warfare Coordination and Reporting (AAWC&R) voice networks and were confirmed to be valid targets by Patriot Batteries who engaged these SCUDs.

In May 1991, Mobile Bay was ordered to Subic Bay, Republic of the Philippines, to participate in Operation Fiery Vigil, the evacuation of thousands of people displaced by the volcanic eruption of Mount Pinatubo. In December 1991, Mobile Bay began work-ups for a spring 1992 Persian Gulf deployment.

On 15 April 1992, Mobile Bay once again set sail for the Persian Gulf. En route, the ship and crew visited Sydney, Australia, to represent the U. S. Navy at the 50th Anniversary celebration of the Battle of Coral Sea. Sailing through the Straits of Hormuz in late May 1992, the ship began duties as the Persian Gulf Anti-Air Warfare Commander. Mobile Bay also played a vital role in Operation Southern Watch, the enforcement of the U. N.-mandated "No Fly Zone" over Southern Iraq. Returning to Japan in October, Mobile Bay participated in ANNUALEX-92, a major naval exercise involving units of the U. S. Navy and the Japanese Maritime Self Defense Force. Mobile Bay served as the Anti-Air Warfare Commander for a joint U. S. - Japanese flotilla.

After participating in SPRING TRAINING-93 off the coast of Australia, she made an historic visit to the Russian seaport of Vladivostok in September 1993.

Mobile Bay was deployed to East Timor as part of the Australian-led INTERFET peacekeeping taskforce from 20 September to 5 October 1999. As the most capable air defense vessel available, the ship was placed in charge of air defence, although the U.S. requests for screening Mobile Bay necessitated a considerable degree of effort by other ships of the force.

In March 2003 Mobile Bay was assigned to Cruiser-Destroyer Group 5.

Mobile Bay operated in support of the 2003 invasion of Iraq from 17 June to 17 December 2004. The ship was later awarded the Iraq Campaign Medal.

In 2006, the cruiser was deployed to the Western Pacific, where she served as the Air Defense Commander for the  Carrier Strike Group.

On 16 February 2007, Mobile Bay was awarded the 2006 Battle "E" award.  The ship completed a 10-month overhaul in early 2010.

On 8 April 2011, the ship was given a failing grade of "unsatisfactory" in her INSURV inspection, mainly for problems with the ship's propulsion, operations, aviation, and communications.  A remedial inspection was scheduled and passed in June 2011.

The ship returned from back to back deployments (2011 and 2012) as the Air Defense Commander for John C Stennis Strike Group. She was awarded the 2012 Battle E and Spokane Award for her service.

In December 2020 the U.S. Navy's Report to Congress on the Annual Long-Range Plan for Construction of Naval Vessels stated that the ship was planned to be placed Out of Commission in Reserve in 2023.

On 9 May 2022, Mobile Bay transited the Philippine Sea.

Mobile Bay participated in RIMPAC 2022.

Awards
 Combat Action Ribbon - (Jan-Feb 1991)
 Joint Meritorious Unit Award - (10-28 Jun 1991)
 Navy Unit Commendation - (Jan-Feb 1991, Jan-May 2003, Sep 2002-Apr 2003, Jul 2012-May 2013)
 Navy Meritorious Unit Commendation - (May-Sep 1992, 7–8 May 1994, Jul 1994-Apr 1996, 7–8 May 1994, 13-24 Dec 2001, Sep 2011-Jan 2012)
 Battle "E" - (1993, 1995, 1998, 2000, 2003, 2004, 2006, 2008, 2012, 2013, 2014, 2015)
 Southwest Asia Service Medal - (Oct 1990-Mar 1991)
 Iraq Campaign Medal - (2004)
 Spokane Trophy Award - (2012)

References

Sources

External links

 Official Navy web site
 USS Mobile Bay webpage
 
 

 

Ticonderoga-class cruisers
Ships built in Pascagoula, Mississippi
1985 ships
Cold War cruisers of the United States
Cruisers of the United States
Gulf War ships of the United States